St Bride's Church is a church in the City of London, England.

St Bride's Church may also refer to:

 St. Bride's Church, Dublin, Ireland
 St Bride's Church, East Kilbride, Scotland
 St Bride's Church, Glasgow, Scotland
 St Bride's Church, Liverpool, England
 St Bride's Church, Onich, Scotland
 St Bride's Church, Llansantffraed, Monmouthshire, Wales

See also
 St Brides (disambiguation)